Algebraic differential geometry may refer to:

Differential algebraic geometry
Differential geometry of algebraic manifolds
Manifolds equipped with a derivation